The Family Honor is a 1920 American silent drama-romance film directed by King Vidor and starring Florence Vidor. A copy of the film is in a French archive.

Plot
As described in a film publication, the proud, Southern, and old Tucker family is now broke and places its hopes on a college youth, Dal (Karns), who has a taste for gambling, his sister Beverly (Vidor), full of hope and trust, and young Ben, a disciple of right thinking. Beverly has put her brother through college only to find out that he has become a first class scamp. To maintain the honor of her name, Beverley's fiance tries to anticipate a raid on a vicious dive in the town that is frequented by Dal. The raid takes place and Dal escapes, only to be later caught and indicted for murder. The evidence is going against Dal until his little brother Ben comes into the courtroom and, with the spirit of truth, testifies such that Dal is freed.

Cast

 Florence Vidor as Beverly Tucker
 Roscoe Karns as Dal Tucker
 Ben Alexander as Little Ben Tucker
 Charles Meredith as Merle Curran
 George Nichols as Mayor Curran
 J. P. Lockney as Felix
 Willis Marks as Dobbs
 Harold Goodwin as The Grocer Boy

Production
In 1919 Vidor formed an independent production company in collaboration with the New York-based First National exhibitors. 
The New York conglomerate controlled numerous theaters, and in a bid to break into movie production, advanced Vidor the funds to build a small 15-acre studio that Vidor christened “Vidor Village”. The financial risks in making independent films were high at a time when Hollywood was witnessing the consolidation of “an increasingly rigid studio system" where production and exhibition were subordinated to market considerations and increasingly judged on profitability.

Vidor opted to make a formula comedy-romance then in vogue starring his spouse Florence Vidor, but preserving the Christian Science precepts that had informed his work with the Brentwood Corporation.

Footnotes

References
Baxter, John. 1976. King Vidor. Simon & Schuster, Inc. Monarch Film Studies. LOC Card Number 75-23544.
Durgnat, Raymond and Simmon, Scott. 1988. King Vidor, American. University of California Press, Berkeley.

External links

1920 films
1920 drama films
1920s English-language films
American silent feature films
American black-and-white films
Films directed by King Vidor
First National Pictures films
1920s American films
Silent American drama films